Canyon High School was a high school in Ogden, Utah.

External links
 Weber County School District

Public high schools in Utah
Buildings and structures in Ogden, Utah
Schools in Weber County, Utah